The  197th Field Artillery Regiment is a regiment in the New Hampshire Army National Guard.

History
B Battery claims to have been formed before 1780 as 1st Company, Light Infantry, 2nd Regiment, 2nd Brigade, 2nd Division, New Hampshire Militia. C Battery traces its history to Captain Waldron’s Minute Company, 2nd New Hampshire Regiment, which was organized on July 3, 1775, making C Battery one of several National Guard units with colonial roots. The regiment takes most of its lineage from the 1st New Hampshire Volunteer Infantry.

Lineage and Honors

Lineage
Reorganized and federally recognized 24 April 1922 in the New Hampshire National Guard at Concord as the 197th Artillery (Coast Artillery Corps)
 HHB from Company C, 1st Infantry NHNG
 Service Battery from I Company 1st Infantry NHNG
 Battery A from Company E, 1st Infantry NHNG
 Battery B from Company F, 1st Infantry NHNG
 Battery C from Company K, 1st Infantry NHNG
 Battery D from Company A, 1st Infantry NHNG
 HHB 2d Battalion from Company M, 1st Infantry NHNG
 Battery E from Company I, 1st Infantry NHNG
 Battery F from Company G, 1st Infantry NHNG
 Battery G from Company L, 1st Infantry NHNG
 Battery H from Company H, 1st Infantry NHNG
Redesignated 23 April 1924 as the 197th Coast Artillery Regiment (Antiaircraft)(Semimobile)
 Inducted into federal service 16 September 1940 at Concord
 3d Battalion activated August 1942
Regiment broken up 15 May 1943 as Follows
 Headquarters and Headquarters Battery, as 197th Antiaircraft Artillery Group (see the 197th Field Artillery Brigade)
 1st Battalion as 744th Antiaircraft Artillery Battalion
 2d Battalion as 210th Antiaircraft Artillery Battalion
 3d Battalion as 237th Antiaircraft Artillery Searchlight Battalion
1 February 1959 744th and 210th AAA Battalions consolidated with 197th Artillery, a parent regiment under the Combat Arms Regimental System
1968-1969 3rd Battalion 197th Artillery served in Vietnam
 B Battery 3-197th-FAR merged with A Battery 2-13th-FAR to form D Battery 2-13th-FAR, "The Jungle Battery".
 Battery E (Target Acquisition), 197th Field Artillery Regiment was activated 1 June 2012

Campaign Participation Credit
unknown

Decorations
Valorous Unit Award, Meritorious Unit Commendation

Vietnam (1968-1969)
During the Vietnam war, 3rd Battalion 197th-FAR served in country from 1968 to 1969.

"Jungle Battery" D BTRY-2nd BN-13th FAR
During its time in Vietnam, Bravo Battery 3-197th merged with Alpha Battery 2-13th to form D Battery 2-13th, known in country as "The Jungle Battery". The newly formed D Battery comprised three 155mm Howitzers from B-BTRY and three 105mm Howitzers, allowing it to provide a multitude of artillery support. The unit supported special forces groups for most of its existence. On April 19th 1969, CPT Roland C Labonte was killed by a enemy mortar round. CPT Labonte was the commander of B BTRY 3-197. He is remembered on the Vietnam Wall, (Panel W26, Line 9), as well as a memorial stone outside of the Nashua Armory, still home of B BTRY 3-197, in Nashua NH.

Casualties
The following are the known losses for 3rd BN-197th FAR during Vietnam, by date.

 02/26/1969
 Non-Battle SFC Raymond Charles Mroczynski (SVC BTRY)
04/19/1969
  CPT Roland Charles Labonte (B BTRY)
 06/23/1969
 Non-Battle SGT William George Gray (HHB)
 07/27/1969
 Non-Battle CPL Mark Lawrence McManus (SVC BTRY)
 08/24/1969 
  2LT Thomas Jerome Dostal (A BTRY)
 08/26/1969
  SGT Gaetan Jean Guy Beaudoin (A BTRY)
  SGT Guy Andre Blanchette (A BTRY)
  SGT Richard Edgar Genest (A BTRY)
  SFC Richard Paul Raymond (A BTRY)
  SGT Richard Edward Robichaud (A BTRY)

Heraldry

Distinctive unit insignia

 Description
A Gold color metal and enamel device  in height overall consisting of a shield blazoned: Azure, in base a lion passant guardant Or, and in fess a lozenge and a fleur-de-lis Argent; on a chief Gules fimbriated of the second a winged projectile, wings inverted, of the last. Attached below the shield a Gold scroll inscribed "A Bas L’Avion" in Black letters.
 Symbolism
The shield is blue to indicate the longer service of the unit as Infantry. The gold lion passant guardant is for service in the War of 1812; the white lozenge—the corps badge for the 2nd Division, 3rd Corps, during the Civil War—represents Civil War service and the fleur-de-lis, service during World War I. The chief is red for Artillery and the winged projectile indicates that it is an anti-aircraft unit.
 Background
The distinctive unit insignia was originally approved for the 197th Coast Artillery Regiment, New Hampshire National Guard on 16 April 1927. It was redesignated for the 744th Antiaircraft Artillery Gun Battalion, New Hampshire National Guard on 28 December 1951. The insignia was redesignated for the 197th Artillery Regiment, New Hampshire National Guard on 29 March 1961. It was redesignated for the 197th Field Artillery Regiment, New Hampshire Army National Guard on 9 August 1972.

Coat of arms

Blazon
 Shield: Azure, in base a lion passant guardant Or, and in fess a lozenge and a fleur-de-lis Argent; on a chief Gules fimbriated of the second a winged projectile, wings inverted, of the last.
 Crest: That for the regiments and separate battalions of the New Hampshire Army National Guard: On a wreath of the colors Or and Azure, two pine branches saltirewise Proper crossed behind a bundle of five arrows palewise Argent, bound together by a ribbon Gules, the ends entwining the branches.
Motto: "A Bas L’Avion" (Down With The Plane).

Symbolism
 Shield: The shield is blue to indicate the longer service of the unit as Infantry. The gold lion passant guardant is for service in the War of 1812; the white lozenge—the corps badge for the 2nd Division, 3rd Corps, during the Civil War—represents Civil War service and the fleur-de-lis, service during World War I. The chief is red for Artillery and the winged projectile indicates that it is an anti-aircraft unit.
 Crest: The crest is that of the New Hampshire Army National Guard.

 Background: The coat of arms was originally approved for the 197th Coast Artillery Regiment, New Hampshire National Guard on 19 April 1927. It was redesignated for the 744th Antiaircraft Artillery Gun Battalion, New Hampshire National Guard on 28 December 1951. The insignia was redesignated for the 197th Artillery Regiment, New Hampshire National Guard on 29 March 1961. It was redesignated for the 197th Field Artillery Regiment, New Hampshire Army National Guard on 9 August 1972.

References

External links
 http://www.history.army.mil/html/forcestruc/lh.html 
 http://www.ozatwar.com/usarmy/197thcar.htm
 https://web.archive.org/web/20131212235622/http://www.seacoastnh.com/Places-%26-Events/NH-History/A-History-of-Portsmouth-Armory/1/

197
197
197
197
1922 establishments in New Hampshire
Military units and formations established in 1922